Fountain "Four Lions", in Sremski Karlovci, Serbia was built in 1799, as a crown of the first town waterworks. The leading architect was an Italian, Giuseppe Aprili, who designed this fountain in baroque style. It is created from the red marble. From that time the fountain has become the symbol of Karlovci. There is an interesting legend about the fountain which says that everyone who drinks water from it will return to Karlovci and get married.  It was recently completely renovated.

See also
Sremski Karlovci

References 

Buildings and structures in Sremski Karlovci
Fountains in Serbia